Mosteiros, Portuguese for monasteries, may refer to the following places:


Cape Verde
Mosteiros, Cape Verde, a town on the island of Fogo
Mosteiros, Cape Verde (municipality), a municipality on the island of Fogo

Portugal
Mosteiros (Ponta Delgada), a civil parish in the municipality of Ponta Delgada, Azores
Mosteiros Islets, a group of islets off the coast of the civil parish of Mosteiros (not to be confused with the islet in Príncipe mentioned below)
Mosteiros, a civil parish in the municipality of Arronches

São Tomé and Príncipe 
 Ilhéu dos Mosteiros, an islet near Príncipe

See also
 Mosteiro (disambiguation)